Zhou Jianchao (born June 11, 1988) is a Chinese chess player. In 2006, he became China's 21st Grandmaster at the age of 17. Zhou competed in the FIDE World Cup in 2007, 2009 and 2015.

Career
Zhou Jianchao learned to play chess at the age of 6.
He achieved the norms required for the Grandmaster title at the 2005 Aeroflot Open (A2 Group), the 2005 Dubai Open and the 2006 Aeroflot Open (A2 Group).
Zhou was the runner-up of the National Individual Championship and joint runner-up of the World Team Championship in 2005.

He is a co-champion of Asian Team Championship and won a Board Gold in 2008.
Zhou reached round three at the World Cup 2007, where he eventually lost to Michael Adams. Zhou knocked out Emil Sutovsky and Andrei Volokitin in the first two rounds. In March 2009, Zhou became for the first time in his career a top 100 player in the world. At the 2009 Aeroflot Open, Zhou came third on tiebreak scoring 6.0/9 (+3,=6,-0) with a 2753 performance.
Also in 2009, he reached the second round of the World Cup in Khanty-Mansiysk.
Zhou Jianchao scored 6/9 points (+3,=6,-0) at the 2010 Aeroflot Open, coming 4th out of 80 players with a 2777 performance.
In 2011 he came third in the Lake Sevan tournament in Martuni and won the 1st Chinese Rapid Championship in Hefei. In 2022 he won the Mission 360 GM/IM Norm #1 tournament in San Jose.

In team events, Zhou played for China in the Chess Olympiad in 2010, the World Team Chess Championship in 2005 (winning the team silver), the Asian Team Chess Championship in 2008, 2012, 2016 and 2018, the 2nd Russia-China Match in 2004 and the World Youth U16 Chess Olympiad in 2004 (winning gold). Zhou Jianchao plays for Shanghai chess club in the China Chess League (CCL).

References

External links

1988 births
Living people
Chess grandmasters
Chess players from Shanghai
Chess Olympiad competitors
Asian Games medalists in chess
Chess players at the 2010 Asian Games
Asian Games gold medalists for China
Medalists at the 2010 Asian Games